The Dodge Journey is a mid-size crossover SUV manufactured and marketed by Fiat Chrysler Automobiles' Dodge brand for model years 2009 to 2020 over a single generation, with a facelift for the 2011 model year. The Journey was styled by Ryan Nagode, and was marketed globally in both left and right hand drive, including as the Fiat Freemont.

Internally identified as the JC49, the Journey shares  FCA's global D-segment platform with the Dodge Avenger and a nearly identical wheelbase to the outgoing short wheel base (SWB) Dodge Caravan.

Having debuted at the 2007 Frankfurt Motor Show, the Journey subsequently appeared at the 2009 Frankfurt Motor Show. All models were manufactured in Mexico at FCA's Toluca Assembly facility, with just over 1.1 million manufactured before production ended in 2020.

Design and equipment
As a mid-size CUV, the Journey was available in five and seven passenger configurations and was noted for its overall packaging and seating flexibility — which included a front passenger seat with under-cushion storage and fold-flat capability; second-row for-aft sliding, reclining, fold-flat seating with an H-point 1.6 inches (40 mm) higher than the front row (aka theater seating); latching under-floor storage with removable bins; available twin booster seats and single-hand-operable third row access; available twin fold-flat third-row seats and an aft under-floor storage compartment. Trim levels varied over model years, to include various options with entertainment/infotainment, cloth or heated leather seats and heated steering wheel as well. Additionally, rear doors opened to 90-degrees, rare for any offerings by the Big Three (automobile manufacturers).

Production versions of 2009 model year vehicles went on sale in early 2008 for the 2009 model-year in North America, and mid-2008 elsewhere. A version for the Chinese market debuted at Auto China in 2008, marketed as the JCUV. Initial model production began in 2009. The Freemont went on sale in Russia in 2013. The Journey was marketed in both LHD and RHD depending on the market.

From 2009 to 2010, the trim levels in North America were the SE (powered by a 2.4L I4), the SXT, and the R/T (both powered by a 3.5L V6).  The SXT and R/T were available with all-wheel drive (AWD).

2011 update
Revisions for the 2011 model-year include modifications to the grille, lower front fascia, redesigned interior, suspension, steering, powertrain, and use of Dodge's new logo, launched in 2011, as well as LED Taillights (not available on base trims). Express and Mainstreet trim levels replace SE and SXT respectively, while Crew and Lux trims are also added to the lineup. The 2011 Journey received new Uconnect 3 infotainment systems with either 4.3-inch (4.3") or 8.4-inch (8.4") LCD color touchscreen displays, and a full-color LCD Electronic Vehicle Information Center (EVIC) in the instrument cluster. The Keyless Enter-'n'-Go System, with keyless access and push-button start, became standard on all Journey models.

For the 2012 model year, the Journey became Dodge's smallest SUV after FCA stopped manufacturing the Nitro. SE and SXT trims return for 2012, replacing Express and Mainstreet trims, respectively. An American Value Package (AVP) model is also added for the United States market that is priced below the SE. For the 2013 model year, Dodge released a "Blacktop" trim option, with 19-inch gloss black aluminium wheels and center caps, a gloss black grille, gloss black bezel headlamps, gloss black lower front fascia accent and gloss black exterior mirrors. In 2014, the Journey Crossroad was introduced with chrome accents along the lower part of the body and in the interior, smoked head and taillights, a black grille, rocker panels, rails for a roof rack, and a skid plate simile at the rear. Chrysler added the revised Dodge logo with two slanted rectangles for the 2013 Model Year. For the 2016 model-year, the Journey's AVP and Limited trims were discontinued and the Crossroad Plus trim was added and also for the 2017 model-year; the R/T trim is replaced by the GT trim.

Pre-facelift styling

Post-facelift styling

2020 model year changes

For the 2020 model year, the Dodge Journey was available in two trim levels: base SE Value and "up-level" Crossroad. All 2020 Journey models were powered by a 2.4-liter inline-four gasoline engine producing 173 horsepower and 166 lb. ft. of torque, with a four-speed automatic transmission, and available with front wheel drive. The optional 3.6-liter Pentastar Variable Valve Timing (VVT) V6 gasoline engine, six-speed automatic transmission, and the option for All Wheel Drive were discontinued. Journey models featured standard three-row, seven-passenger seating, which was previously optional on base trim levels. Available options and packages have been revised. In addition, the Journey (as well as the Dodge Grand Caravan) are not available in states with California emissions requirements for the 2020 model year. 2020 was the final model year for the Journey, Dodge citing the decision to transition to a performance brand.

Fiat Freemont

Chrysler marketed the Mexican manufactured Journey in Europe after model year 2011 as the Fiat Freemont, debuting the rebadged variant at the 2011 Geneva Motor Show.

Fiat also planned on introducing an all-wheel-drive version of the  diesel and the Pentastar V6.

FCA marketed the Freemont and the Journey in Australia, Brazil and China, with the Freemont available with the 2.0- and 2.4-liter four-cylinder engines in markets other than China, while the Journey is now only marketed with the Pentastar V6 engine (both engines were available before the launch of the Freemont).

The Freemont was originally available in left-hand drive (LHD) European markets only, except The Netherlands, but a right-hand drive (RHD) model was eventually introduced for Australia. The Freemont was discontinued after the 2015 model year.

Engines
This is a version of Chrysler's GEMA built, World Gasoline Engine class of four-cylinder engines shared with Hyundai and Mitsubishi.
For 2011, it was changed to the 3.6-liter Pentastar V6, producing  and  torque. Other markets offer the six-speed automatic transmission with the flex-fuel (E85 compatible) 2.7-liter V6. All-wheel drive was only available with a V6.

Additionally, through 2010, a Volkswagen-sourced diesel engine was available outside of North America with an automatically shifted dual clutch transmission. Chrysler performed primary engineering for the dual-clutch transmission with support from long-time partner Getrag, which was to build the transmission in the United States. Due to funding issues, this did not happen and the factory was sold and used for other purposes.

Safety

The Dodge Journey (in the US & Canada) includes multi-stage front driver and passenger air bags, front-seat-mounted side air bags, three-row side-curtain air bags, standard four-wheel disc anti-lock brakes (ABS), electronic stability program (ESP), and electronic roll mitigation, brake assist.

Insurance Institute for Highway Safety (IIHS) was safety tested by IIHS in 2009

Marketing 
Dodge Journeys marketed in Japan are known as Dodge JC, to avoid confusion with Isuzu Journey. JCs were qualified by the Japanese government to be included in Subsidy Scheme for Environmentally Friendly Vehicles.

As part of the vehicle's introductory promotion, Dario Franchitti's No. 40 Dodge Charger carried a "Journey" paint scheme for the 2008 Daytona 500 on February 17, 2008.

Sales

Notes

References

External links

 Dodge Journey U.S.
 Dodge JC Japan
 Dodge Journey Owner's Manual

Journey
Cars of Brazil
Crossover sport utility vehicles
Mid-size sport utility vehicles
Station wagons
2010s cars
2020s cars
Front-wheel-drive vehicles
All-wheel-drive vehicles
Euro NCAP large MPVs
Cars introduced in 2008